The 1973 NCAA College Division baseball tournament decided the champion of baseball at the NCAA College Division level for the 1973 season. This was the sixth such tournament for the College Division, having separated from the University Division in 1957.

Regionals

Northeast Region

Mideast Region

Midwest Region

South Region

South Atlantic Region

West Region

Finals

Participants

Results

Bracket

Game results

See also
 1973 NCAA University Division baseball tournament
 1973 NAIA World Series

References

 
NCAA Division II Baseball Tournament
NCAA College Division baseball tournament